Mauricio Antonio Pastrana Tapi (born 20 January 1973) is a Colombian former professional boxer. He is a former four-weight world champion, having won multiple titles in the light flyweight, super flyweight, and bantamweight divisions, as well as an interim title at flyweight.

Professional career
Pastrana turned professional in October 1991. In his debut at Sincelejo, Colombia, Pastrana defeated fellow debutant Allende Rudino via second-round knockout. On January 18, 1997, Pastrana defeated Michael Carbajal in a twelve-round split decision at the Thomas & Mack Center in Las Vegas for the IBF light flyweight title.

Pastrana would go on to take the Interim WBA flyweight title, IBA and IBO super flyweight titles and IBA Bantamweight titles.

See also 
 List of light-flyweight boxing champions
 List of flyweight boxing champions

References

External links
 

 

 

Living people
1973 births
Light-flyweight boxers
Flyweight boxers
Super-flyweight boxers
Bantamweight boxers
Super-bantamweight boxers
World light-flyweight boxing champions
World flyweight boxing champions
International Boxing Federation champions
World Boxing Association champions
International Boxing Organization champions
Colombian male boxers
People from Montería